Lithabile Mgwadleka (born 7 January 1991 in Bisho, South Africa) is a South African rugby union player, currently playing with the . His regular position is winger or inside centre.

Career

UFH Blues

He represented the  side in the Varsity Shield competition since 2012. He made five appearances in 2012, scoring one try. He also scored one try in eight appearances in 2013 and started all eight of their matches in the 2014 Varsity Shield, scoring three tries as the Blues finished in their highest ever position of third.

Border Bulldogs

He started a further two matches during the competition and was retained in the Border Bulldogs squad that participated in the 2014 Currie Cup qualification tournament.

References

1991 births
Living people
People from Bhisho
Xhosa people
South African rugby union players
Rugby union centres
Rugby union wings
Border Bulldogs players
Rugby union players from the Eastern Cape